Öskjuvatn ("Askja Lake") is a lake in the Highlands of Iceland. Its surface area is about 11 km2.

The lake is situated in the crater of the volcano Askja in the northeast of the glacier Vatnajökull.  The name Öskjuvatn simply means Askja lake. Like the neighbouring crater Víti, it was created by an enormous volcanic eruption in 1875.

On July 10, 1907, two German scientists, Walter von Knebel and Max Rudloff disappeared while exploring the lake in a small boat.  Knebel's fiancée, Ina von Grumbkow, led an expedition in search of them with a vulcanologist Hans Reck, but no trace of them was ever found. Suppositions at the time suggested that seismic volcanic disturbances could have caused a landslip or similar occurrence, and recorded that only two days previously the telegraph cable to Iceland had been broken by deep water disturbances for the first time since it was laid, close to the Icelandic coast.

See also
 Geography of Iceland
 Iceland plume
 List of lakes of Iceland
 List of rivers of Iceland
 Volcanism of Iceland

References

External links
 Photo of Askja and the lake

Calderas of Iceland
Lakes of Iceland
North Volcanic Zone of Iceland
Volcanic crater lakes